William Shepherd (1837 - 19 March 1899) was a sergeant in the United States Army who was awarded the Medal of Honor for gallantry during the American Civil War. He was awarded the medal on 3 May 1865 for actions performed at the Battle of Sailor's Creek on 6 April 1865.

Personal life 
Shepherd was born in 1837. He died on 19 March 1899 in Dillsboro, Indiana and was buried in Conaway Family Cemetery in Dillsboro.

Military service 
Shepherd's Medal of Honor citation reads:

References 

United States Army Medal of Honor recipients
American Civil War recipients of the Medal of Honor
1837 births
1899 deaths